The 1997 Houston Astros season was the 36th season for the Major League Baseball (MLB) franchise in Houston, Texas. In their fourth season in the National League Central and first under former player/broadcaster-turned manager Larry Dierker, the Astros finished in first place, giving them their first playoff berth in eleven years. They clinched the division title eleven years to the day of their last title on September 25.

Offseason
December 2, 1996: Pat Listach signed as a free agent with the Houston Astros.

Regular season
The 1,000 hit of Jeff Bagwell's career was a home run on May 20 against Calvin Maduro, one of his two that game, in a 9–5 win over the Philadelphia Phillies.

Season standings

Record vs. opponents

Opening Day starters
Bobby Abreu
Brad Ausmus
Jeff Bagwell
Derek Bell
Sean Berry
Craig Biggio
Luis Gonzalez
Pat Listach
Shane Reynolds

Notable transactions
 June 3, 1997: 1997 Major League Baseball draft
Lance Berkman was drafted by the Astros in the 1st round (16th pick) . Player signed June 4, 1997.
Eric Byrnes was drafted by the Astros in the 4th round, but did not sign.
 July 1, 1997: Pat Listach was released by the Astros.
 July 27, 1997: Josías Manzanillo was signed as a free agent with the Houston Astros.

Roster

Game log

Regular season

|-style="background:#cfc;"
| 1 || April 1 || 7:06p.m. CDT || Braves || W 2–1 || Reynolds (1–0) || Smoltz (0–1) || Wagner (1) || 2:29 || 44,618 || 1–0 || W1
|-style="background:#cfc;"
| 2 || April 2 || 7:06p.m. CDT || Braves || W 4–3 || Hampton (1–0) || Maddux (0–1) || Wagner (2) || 2:34 || 16,308 || 2–0 || W2
|-style="background:#fcc;"
| 3 || April 3 || 7:06p.m. CDT || Braves || L 2–3 || Glavine (1–0) || Kile (0–1) || Wohlers (1) || 2:38 || 17,693 || 2–1 || L1
|-style="background:#cfc;"
| 4 || April 4 || 7:06p.m. CDT || Cardinals || W 3–2  || Springer (1–0) || Ludwick (0–1) || – || 3:56 || 25,985 || 3–1 || W1
|-style="background:#cfc;"
| 5 || April 5 || 7:07p.m. CDT || Cardinals || W 6–2 || Fernandez (1–0) || Osborne (0–1) || García (1) || 2:54 || 25,957 || 4–1 || W2
|-style="background:#cfc;"
| 6 || April 6 || 1:35p.m. CDT || Cardinals || W 3–2 || Martin (1–0) || Frascatore (0–1) || Wagner (3) || 2:44 || 18,752 || 5–1 || W3
|-style="background:#fcc;"
| 7 || April 8 || 6:40p.m. CDT || @ Braves || L 2–4 || Glavine (2–0) || Hampton (1–1) || Wohlers (3) || 2:48 || 31,064 || 5–2 || L1
|-style="background:#fcc;"
| 8 || April 9 || 6:40p.m. CDT || @ Braves || L 3–4  || Embree (1–0) || Lima (0–1) || – || 3:48 || 33,986 || 5–3 || L2
|-style="background:#cfc;"
| 9 || April 10 || 6:35p.m. CDT || @ Braves || W 5–3 || Holt (1–0) || Smoltz (1–2) || Hudek (1) || 2:58 || 33,637 || 6–3 || W1
|-style="background:#fcc;"
| 10 || April 11 || 7:06p.m. CDT || @ Cardinals || L 2–4 || Batchelor (1–1) || Reynolds (1–1) || Eckersley (1) || 2:41 || 23,744 || 6–4 || L1
|-style="background:#cfc;"
| 11 || April 12 || 1:17p.m. CDT || @ Cardinals || W 7–5 || García (1–0) || Stottlemyre (0–1) || Wagner (4) || 3:15 || 28,235 || 7–4 || W1
|-style="background:#fcc;"
| 12 || April 13 || 7:07p.m. CDT || @ Cardinals || L 2–6 || Benes (1–1) || Hampton (1–2) || Eckersley (2) || 2:38 || 22,705 || 7–5 || L1
|-style="background:#cfc;"
| 13 || April 14 || 1:35p.m. CDT || @ Cardinals || W 4–2  || Wagner (1–0) || Eckersley (0–1) || Hudek (2) || 3:11 || 22,623 || 8–5 || W1
|-style="background:#fcc;"
| 14 || April 15 || 7:08p.m. CDT || Expos || L 5–7 || Martínez (1–0) || Holt (1–1) || – || 2:30 || 18,602 || 8–6 || L1
|-style="background:#cfc;"
| 15 || April 16 || 7:05p.m. CDT || Expos || W 10–2 || Reynolds (2–1) || Valdes (0–2) || – || 3:01 || 14,046 || 9–6 || W1
|-style="background:#fcc;"
| 16 || April 18 || 9:05p.m. CDT || @ Dodgers || L 3–5 || Martínez (2–1) || Hampton (1–3) || Worrell (5) || 3:25 || 38,937 || 9–7 || L1
|-style="background:#cfc;"
| 17 || April 19 || 9:05p.m. CDT || @ Dodgers || W 2–1 || Kile (1–1) || Nomo (2–1) || Wagner (5) || 3:07 || 46,244 || 10–7 || W1
|-style="background:#cfc;"
| 18 || April 20 || 3:07p.m. CDT || @ Dodgers || W 3–1 || Holt (2–1) || Candiotti (2–1) || Hudek (3) || 2:21 || 33,250 || 11–7 || W2
|-style="background:#cfc;"
| 19 || April 22 || 9:06p.m. CDT || @ Padres || W 12–3 || Reynolds (3–1) || Valenzuela (1–2) || – || 3:15 || 16,748 || 12–7 || W3
|-style="background:#cfc;"
| 20 || April 23 || 9:36p.m. CDT || @ Padres || W 11–7 || García (2–0) || Worrell (1–3) || – || 3:09 || 15,534 || 13–7 || W34
|-style="background:#cfc;"
| 21 || April 25 || 7:05p.m. CDT || Giants || W 5–4 || Wagner (2–0) || Roa (1–1) || – || 2:37 || 26,705 || 14–7 || W5
|-style="background:#fcc;"
| 22 || April 26 || 7:05p.m. CDT || Giants || L 0–2 || Estes (4–0) || Holt (2–2) || – || 2:17 || 36,837 || 14–8 || L1
|-style="background:#fcc;"
| 23 || April 27 || 1:35p.m. CDT || Giants || L 2–3 || Fernández (3–1) || Reynolds (3–2) || Beck (11) || 2:33 || 22,316 || 14–9 || L2
|-style="background:#fcc;"
| 24 || April 28 || 7:05p.m. CDT || Rockies || L 6–7  || McCurry (1–0) || Wagner (2–1) || Ruffin (6) || 3:35 || 13,510 || 14–10 || L3
|-style="background:#cfc;"
| 25 || April 29 || 12:35p.m. CDT || Rockies || W 3–1 || Wall (1–0) || Bailey (3–1) || Hudek (4) || 2:16 || 13,567 || 15–10 || W1
|-style="background:#fcc;"
| 26 || April 30 || 6:39p.m. CDT || @ Expos || L 6–8 || Pérez (4–1) || Kile (1–2) || Urbina (2) || 3:01 || 12,346 || 15–11 || L1
|-

|-style="background:#fcc;"
| 27 || May 1 || 12:39p.m. CDT || @ Expos || L 0–4 || Martínez (4–0) || Holt (2–3) || – || 2:11 || 12,328 || 15–12 || L2
|-style="background:#cfc;"
| 28 || May 2 || 7:05p.m. CDT || Marlins || W 2–1 || Reynolds (4–2) || Rapp (2–2) || Wagner (6) || 2:32 || 25,421 || 16–12 || W1
|-style="background:#fcc;"
| 29 || May 3 || 7:05p.m. CDT || Marlins || L 8–9  || Heredia (2–0) || García (2–1) || Powell (1) || 4:54 || 24,539 || 16–13 || L1
|-style="background:#cfc;"
| 30 || May 4 || 7:06p.m. CDT || Marlins || W 1–0 || Kile (2–2) || Brown (3–2) || – || 2:25 || 16,469 || 17–13 || W1
|-style="background:#cfc;"
| 31 || May 5 || 7:05p.m. CDT || Phillies || W 9–2 || Holt (3–3) || Leiter (3–3) || – || 2:33 || 11,268 || 18–13 || W2
|-style="background:#fcc;"
| 32 || May 6 || 7:07p.m. CDT || Phillies || L 1–5 || Schilling (4–3) || García (2–2) || – || 3:05 || 12,179 || 18–14 || L1
|-style="background:#fcc;"
| 33 || May 7 || 7:05p.m. CDT || Mets || L 1–4 || Reynoso (2–0) || Martin (1–1) || Franco (8) || 2:55 || 12,574 || 18–15 || L2
|-style="background:#cfc;"
| 34 || May 8 || 12:35p.m. CDT || Mets || W 4–2 || Hampton (2–3) || Reed (3–2) || Wagner (7) || 2:28 || 12,842 || 19–15 || W1
|-style="background:#fcc;"
| 35 || May 9 || 6:05p.m. CDT || @ Marlins || L 2–3 || Nen (2–1) || Lima (0–2) || – || 3:04 || 30,525 || 19–16 || L1
|-style="background:#cfc;"
| 36 || May 10 || 6:06p.m. CDT || @ Marlins || W 4–2 || Holt (4–3) || Helling (1–2) || Wagner (8) || 3:04 || 42,132 || 20–16 || W1
|-style="background:#fcc;"
| 37 || May 11 || 12:38p.m. CDT || @ Marlins || L 3–6 || Fernandez (4–4) || Wall (1–1) || Nen (9) || 3:06 || 30,030 || 20–17 || L1
|-style="background:#fcc;"
| 38 || May 12 || 6:06p.m. CDT || @ Marlins || L 4–11 || Stanifer (1–0) || Reynolds (4–3) || – || 2:51 || 15,342 || 20–18 || L2
|-style="background:#fcc;"
| 39 || May 13 || 5:40p.m. CDT || @ Mets || L 3–4 || McMichael (3–2) || Springer (1–1) || Franco (11) || 2:28 || 13,997 || 20–19 || L3
|-style="background:#cfc;"
| 40 || May 14 || 6:42p.m. CDT || @ Mets || W 1–0 || Kile (3–2) || McMichael (3–3) || Wagner (9) || 2:28 || 13,051 || 21–19 || W1
|-style="background:#cfc;"
| 41 || May 16 || 6:05p.m. CDT || @ Phillies || W 12–7 || Holt (5–3) || Leiter (3–4) || – || 3:09 || 13,456 || 22–19 || W2
|-style="background:#fcc;"
| 42 || May 17 || 6:05p.m. CDT || @ Phillies || L 2–4 || Schilling (6–3) || Reynolds (4–4) || Bottalico (9) || 2:27 || 17,138 || 22–20 || L1
|-style="background:#fcc;"
| 43 || May 18 || 12:35p.m. CDT || @ Phillies || L 3–5 || Stephenson (1–0) || Hampton (2–4) || Bottalico (10) || 2:29 || 17,367 || 22–21 || L2
|-style="background:#cfc;"
| 44 || May 19 || 6:07p.m. CDT || @ Phillies || W 9–5 || Kile (4–2) || Maduro (3–5) || – || 3:01 || 15,122 || 23–21 || W1
|-style="background:#fcc;"
| 45 || May 20 || 7:06p.m. CDT || Reds || L 4–7 || Smiley (4–6) || Springer (1–2) || Shaw (5) || 2:51 || 14,954 || 23–22 || L1
|-style="background:#cfc;"
| 46 || May 21 || 7:05p.m. CDT || Reds || W 4–3  || Martin (2–1) || Sullivan (0–1) || – || 4:22 || 15,088 || 24–22 || W1
|-style="background:#fcc;"
| 47 || May 23 || 8:05p.m. CDT || @ Rockies || L 7–8 || Jones (1–0) || Wall (1–2) || Reed (4) || 2:42 || 48,127 || 24–23 || L1
|-style="background:#cfc;"
| 48 || May 24 || 2:35p.m. CDT || @ Rockies || W 7–0 || Kile (5–2) || Burke (0–1) || – || 2:48 || 48,129 || 25–23 || W1
|-style="background:#fcc;"
| 49 || May 25 || 2:05p.m. CDT || @ Rockies || L 5–8 || Bailey (5–4) || García (2–3) || Munoz (1) || 2:55 || 48,222 || 25–24 || L1
|-style="background:#fcc;"
| 50 || May 26 || 3:06p.m. CDT || @ Giants || L 3–4 || Tavárez (1–2) || Lima (0–3) || – || 3:09 || 16,059 || 25–25 || L2
|-style="background:#fcc;"
| 51 || May 27 || 2:36p.m. CDT || @ Giants || L 4–5  || Beck (3–2) || Wagner (2–2) || – || 3:18 || 8,437 || 25–26 || L3
|-style="background:#cfc;"
| 52 || May 29 || 7:05p.m. CDT || Padres || W 10–6 || Kile (6–2) || Valenzuela (2–7) || – || 3:23 || 13,793 || 26–26 || W1
|-style="background:#fcc;"
| 53 || May 30 || 7:06p.m. CDT || Padres || L 2–9 || Cunnane (3–1) || Holt (5–4) || Worrell (1) || 2:43 || 31,339 || 26–27 || L1
|-style="background:#fcc;"
| 54 || May 31 || 7:05p.m. CDT || Padres || L 5–12 || Hitchcock (5–5) || Reynolds (4–5) || Smith (1) || 2:58 || 39,286 || 26–28 || L2
|-

|-style="background:#fcc;"
| 55 || June 1 || 1:36p.m. CDT || Padres || L 3–6 || Hamilton (4–2) || Wagner (2–3) || Hoffman (8) || 2:57 || 19,899 || 26–29 || L3
|-style="background:#cfc;"
| 56 || June 2 || 7:05p.m. CDT || Dodgers || W 2–0 || Wall (2–2) || Nomo (5–5) || Lima (1) || 2:28 || 16,227 || 27–29 || W1
|-style="background:#cfc;"
| 57 || June 3 || 12:35p.m. CDT || Dodgers || W 4–3 || Magnante (1–0) || Radinsky (2–1) || – || 3:16 || 17,268 || 28–29 || W2
|-style="background:#cfc;"
| 58 || June 4 || 6:35p.m. CDT || @ Reds || W 5–2 || Holt (6–4) || Burba (4–5) || Wagner (10) || 2:29 || 18,849 || 29–29 || W3
|-style="background:#fcc;"
| 59 || June 5 || 11:35a.m. CDT || @ Reds || L 5–6 || Schourek (5–4) || Reynolds (4–6) || Shaw (9) || 2:53 || 22,437 || 29–30 || L1
|-style="background:#cfc;"
| 60 || June 6 || 9:05p.m. CDT || @ Padres || W 8–7 || Lima (1–3) || Hamilton (4–3) || Wagner (11) || 3:27 || 21,700 || 30–30 || W1
|-style="background:#fcc;"
| 61 || June 7 || 9:06p.m. CDT || @ Padres || L 4–5  || Hoffman (3–3) || García (2–4) || – || 3:24 || 34,763 || 30–31 || L1
|-style="background:#cfc;"
| 62 || June 8 || 3:06p.m. CDT || @ Padres || W 9–0 || Kile (7–2) || Valenzuela (2–8) || – || 2:40 || 28,939 || 30–32 || L2
|-style="background:#fcc;"
| 63 || June 9 || 9:05p.m. CDT || @ Dodgers || L 3–8 || Martínez (6–3) || Holt (6–5) || – || 2:54 || 25,585 || 31–32 || L1
|-style="background:#cfc;"
| 64 || June 10 || 9:05p.m. CDT || @ Dodgers || W 6–3 || Magnante (2–0) || Osuna )1–2) || Wagner (12) || 3:16 || 26,491 || 32–32 || W1
|-style="background:#fcc;"
| 65 || June 11 || 9:35p.m. CDT || @ Dodgers || L 5–10 || Park (5–3) || Hampton (2–5) || – || 3:09 || 52,873 || 32–33 || L1
|-style="background:#fcc;"
| 66 || June 13 || 7:05p.m. CDT || Twins || L 1–8 || Radke (6–5) || Wall (2–3) || – || 2:40 || 30,956 || 32–34 || L2
|-style="background:#fcc;"
| 67 || June 14 || 7:05p.m. CDT || Twins || L 1–6 || Robertson (7–3) || Kile (7–3) || – || 2:44 || 27,172 || 32–35 || L3
|-style="background:#cfc;"
| 68 || June 15 || 1:35p.m. CDT || Twins || W 3–2 || Wagner (3–3) || Guardado (0–2) || – || 2:35 || 28,218 || 33–35 || W1
|-style="background:#fcc;"
| 69 || June 16 || 7:06p.m. CDT || @ Royals || L 2–5 || Rosado (7–3) || Hampton (2–6) || – || 2:47 || 22,528 || 33–36 || L1
|-style="background:#cfc;"
| 70 || June 17 || 7:05p.m. CDT || @ Royals || W 10–2 || García (3–4) || Haney (0–2) || – || 2:46 || 20,588 || 34–36 || W1
|-style="background:#fcc;"
| 71 || June 18 || 7:05p.m. CDT || @ Royals || L 2–6 || Pittsley (2–4) || Wall (2–4) || – || 2:30 || 20,085 || 34–37 || L1
|-style="background:#cfc;"
| 72 || June 20 || 7:05p.m. CDT || Cubs || W 7–3 || Kile (8–3) || Trachsel (4–6) || – || 2:49 || 30,085 || 35–37 || W1
|-style="background:#cfc;"
| 73 || June 21 || 12:15p.m. CDT || Cubs || W 7–3 || Holt (7–5) || Castillo (4–9) || – || 2:52 || 25,227 || 36–37 || W2
|-style="background:#cfc;"
| 74 || June 22 || 1:36p.m. CDT || Cubs || W 3–1 || Hampton (3–6) || Foster (8–5) || Wagner (13) || 2:15 || 23,407 || 37–37 || W3
|-style="background:#fcc;"
| 75 || June 23 || 7:05p.m. CDT || Pirates || L 0–6 || Córdova (6–5) || García (3–5) || – || 2:24 || 16,738 || 37–38 || L1
|-style="background:#fcc;"
| 76 || June 24 || 7:05p.m. CDT || Pirates || L 3–8 || Lieber (4–8) || Wall (2–5) || – || 2:44 || 17,972 || 37–39 || L2
|-style="background:#cfc;"
| 77 || June 25 || 12:36p.m. CDT || Pirates || W 5–1 || Kile (9–3) || Sodowsky (0–1) || – || 2:30 || 26,954 || 38–39 || W1
|-style="background:#cfc;"
| 78 || June 26 || 7:06p.m. CDT || @ Cubs || W 7–6  || Wagner (4–3) || Adams (1–4) || Minor (1) || 3:52 || 30,473 || 39–39 || W2
|-style="background:#fcc;"
| 79 || June 27 || 2:23p.m. CDT || @ Cubs || L 1–2 || Foster (9–5) || Hampton (3–7) || Wendell (4) || 2:54 || 28,265 || 39–40 || L1
|-style="background:#fcc;"
| 80 || June 28 || 12:09p.m. CDT || @ Cubs || L 2–5 || González (4–2) || García (3–6) || Bottenfield (1) || 2:58 || 38,244 || 39–41 || L2
|-style="background:#cfc;"
| 81 || June 29 || 1:22p.m. CDT || @ Cubs || W 10–8 || Minor (1–0) || Mulholland (5–9) || Wagner (14) || 3:34 || 30,542 || 40–41 || W1
|-style="background:#fcc;"
| 82 || June 30 || 7:05p.m. CDT || Indians || L 4–6 || Mesa (1–4) || Martin (2–2) || Jackson (9) || 3:07 || 29,051 || 40–42 || L1
|-

|-style="background:#fcc;"
| 83 || July 1 || 7:04p.m. CDT || Indians || L 6–8 || Plunk (3–2) || Lima (1–4) || Jackson (10) || 3:05 || 23,998 || 40–43 || L2
|-style="background:#cfc;"
| 84 || July 2 || 7:05p.m. CDT || Indians || W 6–2 || Hampton (4–7) || Hershiser (7–5) || – || 2:33 || 25,661 || 41–43 || W1
|-style="background:#fcc;"
| 85 || July 3 || 7:06p.m. CDT || Reds || L 3–4 || Smiley (6–10) || García (3–7) || Shaw (17) || 2:33 || 14,708 || 41–44 || L1
|-style="background:#fcc;"
| 86 || July 4 || 6:05p.m. CDT || Reds || L 2–4 || Morgan (3–5) || Greene (0–1) || Shaw (18) || 2:43 || 34,808 || 41–45 || L2
|-style="background:#cfc;"
| 87 || July 5 || 7:05p.m. CDT || Reds || W 2–1 || Kile (10–3) || Mercker (6–6) || Wagner (15) || 2:26 || 24,022 || 42–45 || W1
|-style="background:#cfc;"
| 88 || July 6 || 1:37p.m. CDT || Reds || W 6–5 || Wagner (5–3) || Remlinger (3–4) || – || 2:43 || 25,564 || 43–45 || W2
|- style="text-align:center; background:#bbcaff;"
| colspan="12" | 68th All-Star Game in Cleveland, Ohio
|-style="background:#cfc;"
| 89 || July 10 || 6:35p.m. CDT || @ Pirates || W 7–0 || Kile (11–3) || Schmidt (4–5) || – || 2:39 || 17,335 || 44–45 || W3
|-style="background:#cfc;"
| 90 || July 11 || 6:35p.m. CDT || @ Pirates || W 10–0 || Hampton (5–7) || Loaiza (6–6) || – || 2:37 || 21,913 || 45–45 || W4
|-style="background:#fcc;"
| 91 || July 12 || 6:40p.m. CDT || @ Pirates || L 0–3  || Rincón (3–4) || Hudek (0–1) || – || 2:39 || 44,119 || 45–46 || L1
|-style="background:#fcc;"
| 92 || July 13 || 12:35p.m. CDT || @ Pirates || L 3–5 || Sodowsky (1–1) || Springer (1–3) || Loiselle (11) || 3:03 || 25,675 || 45–47 || L2
|-style="background:#cfc;"
| 93 || July 14 || 7:05p.m. CDT || @ Cubs || W 9–7  || Wagner (6–3) || Tatís (0–1) || Springer (1) || 5:19 || 27,803 || 46–47 || W1
|-style="background:#cfc;"
| 94 || July 15 || 1:23p.m. CDT || @ Cubs || W 5–3 || Kile (12–3) || Rojas (0–3) || Magnante (1) || 2:42 || 19,323 || 47–47 || W2
|-style="background:#cfc;"
| 95 || July 16 || 7:07p.m. CDT || Giants || W 8–1 || Hampton (6–7) || Foulke (1–4) || – || 2:45 || 24,522 || 48–47 || W3
|-style="background:#fcc;"
| 96 || July 17 || 12:35p.m. CDT || Giants || L 1–3 || Gardner (10–4) || Holt (7–6) || Beck (30) || 2:33 || 29,955 || 48–48 || L1
|-style="background:#cfc;"
| 97 || July 18 || 6:40p.m. CDT || @ Expos || W 2–0 || García (4–7) || Martínez (11–5) || Wagner (16) || 2:52 || 19,379 || 49–48 || W1
|-style="background:#cfc;"
| 98 || July 19 || 6:37p.m. CDT || @ Expos || W 8–6 || Reynolds (5–6) || Juden (11–3) || Wagner (17) || 3:13 || 34,518 || 50–48 || W2
|-style="background:#cfc;"
| 99 || July 20 || 1:10p.m. CDT || @ Expos || W 9–0 || Kile (13–3) || Hermanson (4–5) || – || 2:14 || 26,873 || 51–48 || W3
|-style="background:#cfc;"
| 100 || July 22 || 7:08p.m. CDT || @ Cardinals || W 4–2 || Hampton (7–7) || Benes (6–5) || Wagner (18) || 2:26 || 33,964 || 52–48 || W4
|-style="background:#cfc;"
| 101 || July 23 || 7:06p.m. CDT || @ Cardinals || W 7–2 || Magnante (3–0) || Stottlemyre (9–7) || – || 2:52 || 33,376 || 53–48 || W5
|-style="background:#cfc;"
| 102 || July 24 || 7:06p.m. CDT || Expos || W 10–5 || Martin (3–2) || Telford (2–3) || – || 2:55 || 23,889 || 54–48 || W6
|-style="background:#cfc;"
| 103 || July 25 || 7:05p.m. CDT || Expos || W 5–2 || Kile (14–3) || Juden (11–4) || – || 2:18 || 35,102 || 55–48 || W7
|-style="background:#cfc;"
| 104 || July 26 || 7:06p.m. CDT || Expos || W 9–8  || Wagner (7–3) || Urbina (3–7) || – || 3:21 || 33,868 || 56–48 || W8
|-style="background:#cfc;"
| 105 || July 27 || 1:39p.m. CDT || Expos || W 7–2 || Hampton (8–7) || Bullinger (6–10) || – || 2:12 || 26,713 || 57–48 || W9
|-style="background:#fcc;"
| 106 || July 28 || 7:05p.m. CDT || Cardinals || L 1–2 || Stottlemyre (10–7) || Holt (7–7) || Eckersley (26) || 2:20 || 25,995 || 57–49 || L1
|-style="background:#cfc;"
| 107 || July 29 || 7:05p.m. CDT || Cardinals || W 5–4 || Reynolds (6–6) || Osborne (1–3) || Wagner (19) || 3:06 || 25,399 || 58–49 || W1
|-style="background:#cfc;"
| 108 || July 30 || 7:06p.m. CDT || Cardinals || W 7–4 || Kile (15–3) || Fossas (1–2) || Martin (1) || 3:04 || 28,204 || 59–49 || W2
|-

|-style="background:#fcc;"
| 109 || August 1 || 7:06p.m. CDT || Mets || L 5–8  || Franco (3–1) || Lima (1–5) || – || 3:28 || 33,589 || 59–50 || L1
|-style="background:#cfc;"
| 110 || August 2 || 12:15p.m. CDT || Mets || W 6–0 || Hampton (9–7) || Jones (12–7) || – || 2:33 || 31,929 || 60–50 || W1
|-style="background:#cfc;"
| 111 || August 3 || 1:35p.m. CDT || Mets || W 3–2 || Martin (4–2) || McMichael (7–9) || – || 3:06 || 35,788 || 61–50 || W2
|-style="background:#fcc;"
| 112 || August 4 || 6:05p.m. CDT || @ Marlins || L 1–4 || Hernández (6–0) || Holt (7–8) || Powell (2) || 2:17 || 18,323 || 61–51 || L1
|-style="background:#fcc;"
| 113 || August 5 || 6:06p.m. CDT || @ Marlins || L 5–6 || Nen (8–2) || Wagner (7–4) || – || 3:13 || 25,483 || 61–52 || L2
|-style="background:#fcc;"
| 114 || August 6 || 6:37p.m. CDT || @ Phillies || L 4–6 || Stephenson (6–5) || García (4–8) || Bottalico (21) || 2:40 || 15,557 || 61–53 || L3
|-style="background:#fcc;"
| 115 || August 7 || 12:06p.m. CDT || @ Phillies || L 5–6  || Brewer (1–2) || Martin (4–3) || – || 3:17 || 18,046 || 62–53 || L4
|-style="background:#fcc;"
| 116 || August 8 || 6:40p.m. CDT || @ Mets || L 1–6 || Bohanon (3–1) || Reynolds (6–7) || – || 2:40 || 23,818 || 61–55 || L5
|-style="background:#cfc;"
| 117 || August 9 || 6:11p.m. CDT || @ Mets || W 8–3 || Springer (2–3) || Rojas (0–5) || – || 2:40 || 34,352 || 62–55 || W1
|-style="background:#cfc;"
| 118 || August 10 || 12:41p.m. CDT || @ Mets || W 11–8 || Kile (16–3) || Reed (10–5) || Martin (2) || 3:02 || 32,914 || 63–55 || W2
|-style="background:#cfc;"
| 119 || August 11 || 6:41p.m. CDT || @ Mets || W 8–3 || García (5–8) || Harnisch (0–1) || – || 2:49 || 20,452 || 64–55 || W3
|-style="background:#cfc;"
| 120 || August 12 || 7:06p.m. CDT || Marlins || W 13–2 || Hampton (10–7) || Leiter (8–9) || – || 2:50 || 19,296 || 65–55 || W4
|-style="background:#fcc;"
| 121 || August 13 || 6:36p.m. CDT || Marlins || L 6–8 || Fernandez (15–8) || Lima (1–6) || Nen (30) || 3:24 || 22,543 || 65–56 || L1
|-style="background:#fcc;"
| 122 || August 15 || 7:05p.m. CDT || Phillies || L 1–5 || Schilling (13–10) || Holt (7–9) || – || 2:17 || 31,837 || 65–57 || L2
|-style="background:#fcc;"
| 123 || August 16 || 12:16p.m. CDT || Phillies || L 3–5 || Spradlin (2–6) || Wagner (7–5) || Bottalico (23) || 2:47 || 28,260 || 65–58 || L3
|-style="background:#cfc;"
| 124 || August 17 || 1:36p.m. CDT || Phillies || W 11–6 || Martin (5–3) || Gomes (2–1) || Springer (2) || 3:36 || 23,161 || 66–58 || W1
|-style="background:#fcc;"
| 125 || August 19 || 7:06p.m. CDT || Braves || L 3–4 || Smoltz (12–10) || Hampton (10–8) || Wohlers (30) || 2:46 || 32,145 || 66–59 || L1
|-style="background:#fcc;"
| 126 || August 20 || 7:06p.m. CDT || Braves || L 1–3 || Glavine (11–6) || Reynolds (6–8) || Wohlers (31) || 2:46 || 25,593 || 66–60 || L2
|-style="background:#cfc;"
| 127 || August 21 || 7:05p.m. CDT || Rockies || W 10–4 || Holt (8–9) || Bailey (9–9) || – || 3:00 || 22,962 || 67–60 || W1
|-style="background:#cfc;"
| 128 || August 22 || 7:05p.m. CDT || Rockies || W 9–1 || Kile (17–3) || Thomson (5–8) || – || 2:49 || 33,061 || 68–60 || W2
|-style="background:#fcc;"
| 129 || August 23 || 12:17p.m. CDT || Rockies || L 3–6 || Reed (4–5) || Hudek (0–2) || Dipoto (10) || 3:17 || 32,374 || 68–61 || L1
|-style="background:#cfc;"
| 130 || August 24 || 1:38p.m. CDT || Rockies || W 3–1 || Hampton (11–8) || Wright (6–10) || – || 2:09 || 28,918 || 68–62 || W1
|-style="background:#fcc;"
| 131 || August 26 || 6:40p.m. CDT || @ Braves || L 6–7  || Clontz (5–1) || Wagner (7–6) || – || 3:47 || 37,313 || 69–62 || L1
|-style="background:#cfc;"
| 132 || August 27 || 6:40p.m. CDT || @ Braves || W 6–4  || Hudek (1–2) || Byrd (3–3) || Lima (2) || 4:28 || 33,019 || 70–62 || W1
|-style="background:#fcc;"
| 133 || August 28 || 6:40p.m. CDT || @ Braves || L 2–4 || Neagle (18–3) || Kile (17–4) || Wohlers (32) || 2:32 || 37,849 || 70–63 || L1
|-style="background:#fcc;"
| 134 || August 29 || 7:06p.m. CDT || @ White Sox || L 4–5 || Foulke (2–5) || Hudek (1–3) || Karchner (11) || 3:08 || 21,312 || 70–64 || L2
|-style="background:#fcc;"
| 135 || August 30 || 6:05p.m. CDT || @ White Sox || L 2–9 || Bere (3–0) || Hampton (11–9) || – || 2:31 || 28,051 || 70–65 || L3
|-style="background:#fcc;"
| 136 || August 31 || 1:07p.m. CDT || @ White Sox || L 1–3 || Baldwin (11–13) || Reynolds (6–9) || Karchner (12) || 3:18 || 22,916 || 70–66 || L4
|-

|-style="background:#fcc;"
| 137 || September 1 || 1:36p.m. CDT || Brewers || L 2–3 || Adamson (5–2) || Holt (8–10) || Jones (30) || 2:58 || 35,685 || 70–67 || L5
|-style="background:#fcc;"
| 138 || September 2 || 7:05p.m. CDT || Brewers || L 2–4 || Villone (1–0) || Kile (17–5) || Jones (31) || 2:42 || 18,258 || 70–68 || L6
|-style="background:#cfc;"
| 139 || September 3 || 7:05p.m. CDT || Brewers || W 4–0 || García (6–8) || Karl (10–11) || – || 2:26 || 13,580 || 71–68 || W1
|-style="background:#cfc;"
| 140 || September 4 || 9:07p.m. CDT || @ Giants || W 14–2 || Hampton (12–9) || Gardner (12–8) || – || 3:02 || 8,565 || 72–68 || W2
|-style="background:#fcc;"
| 141 || September 5 || 9:07p.m. CDT || @ Giants || L 1–4 || Hernández (7–2) || Reynolds (6–10) || Beck (35) || 3:19 || 11,934 || 72–69 || L1
|-style="background:#fcc;"
| 142 || September 6 || 3:08p.m. CDT || @ Giants || L 3–5 || Tavárez (6–4) || Wagner (7–7) || Hernández (2) || 3:21 || 17,636 || 72–70 || L2
|-style="background:#fcc;"
| 143 || September 7 || 3:08p.m. CDT || @ Giants || L 1–5 || Rueter (11–6) || Kile (17–6) || – || 3:17 || 19,861 || 72–71 || L3
|-style="background:#cfc;"
| 144 || September 9 || 8:05p.m. CDT || @ Rockies || W 7–4 || Hampton (13–9) || Wright (6–11) || Springer (3) || 2:46 || 48,039 || 73–71 || W1
|-style="background:#fcc;"
| 145 || September 10 || 2:05p.m. CDT || @ Rockies || L 7–9 || Leskanic (4–0) || Magnante (3–1) || Dipoto (13) || 3:08 || 42,321 || 73–72 || L1
|-style="background:#cfc;"
| 146 || September 12 || 7:06p.m. CDT || Dodgers || W 10–3 || Reynolds (7–10) || Park (13–7) || – || 3:02 || 36,817 || 74–72 || W1
|-style="background:#cfc;"
| 147 || September 13 || 7:05p.m. CDT || Dodgers || W 5–1 || Kile (18–6) || Candiotti (10–6) || – || 2:43 || 33,130 || 75–72 || W2
|-style="background:#fcc;"
| 148 || September 14 || 1:36p.m. CDT || Dodgers || L 3–4  || Radinsky (5–1) || Wagner (7–8) || Worrell (35) || 3:32 || 32,666 || 75–73 || L1
|-style="background:#fcc;"
| 149 || September 15 || 7:06p.m. CDT || Padres || L 3–4 || Smith (6–5) || Hampton (13–10) || Hoffman (34) || 3:27 || 22,566 || 75–74 || L3
|-style="background:#cfc;"
| 150 || September 16 || 12:35p.m. CDT || Padres || W 15–3 || García (7–8) || Hitchcock (10–10) || – || 3:11 || 15,156 || 76–74 || W1
|-style="background:#cfc;"
| 151 || September 17 || 7:16p.m. CDT || @ Pirates || W 8–4 || Reynolds (8–10) || Schmidt (9–8) || – || 2:52 || 27,422 || 77–74 || W2
|-style="background:#fcc;"
| 152 || September 18 || 6:04p.m. CDT || @ Pirates || L 3–12 || Córdova (11–8) || Kile (18–7) || – || 2:57 || 14,852 || 77–75 || L1
|-style="background:#fcc;"
| 153 || September 19 || 6:35p.m. CDT || @ Reds || L 4–5 || Burba (10–10) || Holt (8–11) || Shaw (40) || 2:44 || 21,791 || 77–76 || L2
|-style="background:#cfc;"
| 154 || September 20 || 12:05p.m. CDT || @ Reds || W 4–1 || Hampton (14–10) || Tomko (11–7) || Wagner (20) || 2:39 || 20,197 || 78–76 || W1
|-style="background:#cfc;"
| 155 || September 21 || 1:15p.m. CDT || @ Reds || W 8–3 || García (8–8) || Morgan (8–12) || – || 3:16 || 22,652 || 79–76 || W2
|-style="background:#cfc;"
| 156 || September 22 || 11:35a.m. CDT || @ Reds || W 6–3 || Springer (3–3) || Belinda (1–5) || Wagner (21) || 3:13 || 17,411 || 80–76 || W3
|-style="background:#cfc;"
| 157 || September 23 || 7:06p.m. CDT || Cubs || W 5–3 || Kile (19–7) || Trachsel (8–12) || Wagner (22) || 2:44 || 19,380 || 81–76 || W4
|-style="background:#fcc;"
| 158 || September 24 || 7:05p.m. CDT || Cubs || L 1–3 || Clark (14–8) || Holt (8–12) || Adams (18) || 3:00 || 41,560 || 81–77 || L1
|-style="background:#cfc;"
| 159 || September 25 || 7:07p.m. CDT || Cubs || W 9–1 || Hampton (15–10) || González (11–9) || – || 2:42 || 35,623 || 82–77 || W1
|-style="background:#cfc;"
| 160 || September 26 || 7:06p.m. CDT || Pirates || W 2–0 || García (9–8) || Loaiza (11–11) || Wagner (23) || 2:18 || 37,850 || 83–77 || W2
|-style="background:#cfc;"
| 161 || September 27 || 7:05p.m. CDT || Pirates || W 8–1 || Reynolds (9–10) || Schmidt (10–9) || – || 2:45 || 36,170 || 84–77 || W3
|-style="background:#fcc;"
| 162 || September 28 || 1:35p.m. CDT || Pirates || L 4–5  || Christiansen (3–0) || Henríquez (0–1) || Loiselle (29) || 2:58 || 30,606 || 84–78 || L1
|-

|- style="text-align:center;"
| Legend:       = Win       = Loss       = PostponementBold = Astros team member

Postseason Game log

|-style="background:#fcc;"
| 1 || September 30 || 12:07p.m. CDT || @ Braves || L 1–2 || Maddux (1–0) || Kile (0–1) || – || 2:15 || 46,467 || ATL 1–0 || L1
|-style="background:#fcc;"
| 2 || October 1 || 12:07p.m. CDT || @ Braves || L 3–13 || Glavine (1–0) || Hampton (0–1) || – || 3:06 || 49,200 || ATL 2–0 || L2
|-style="background:#fcc;"
| 3 || October 3 || 3:07p.m. CDT || Braves || L 1–4 || Smoltz (1–0) || Reynolds (0–1) || – || 2:35 || 53,688 || ATL 3–0 || L3
|-

|- style="text-align:center;"
| Legend:       = Win       = Loss       = PostponementBold = Astros team member

Player stats

Batting

Starters by position 
Note: Pos = Position; G = Games played; AB = At bats; H = Hits; Avg. = Batting average; HR = Home runs; RBI = Runs batted in

Other batters 
Note: G = Games played; AB = At bats; H = Hits; Avg. = Batting average; HR = Home runs; RBI = Runs batted in

Pitching

Starting pitchers 
Note: G = Games pitched; IP = Innings pitched; W = Wins; L = Losses; ERA = Earned run average; SO = Strikeouts

Other pitchers 
Note: G = Games pitched; IP = Innings pitched; W = Wins; L = Losses; ERA = Earned run average; SO = Strikeouts

Relief pitchers 
Note: G = Games pitched; W = Wins; L = Losses; SV = Saves; ERA = Earned run average; SO = Strikeouts

National League Divisional Playoffs

The Atlanta Braves defeated the Houston Astros, three games to none.

Farm system

References

External links
1997 Houston Astros season at Baseball Reference

Houston Astros seasons
Houston Astros season
National League Central champion seasons
1997 in sports in Texas